Buffalo rifle generally refers to large-calibre, generally single-shot black powder cartridge firearms which were used to hunt the American Bison to near-extinction in the late-19th Century. Three types of rifles in particular were used by professional bison hunters, namely the Sharps rifle, the Springfield Rifle and the Remington No.1 rifle otherwise known simply as the Rolling block. The Sharps was the favorite among hunters because of its accuracy at long range.

See also
.45-70
.50-70 Government
.50-90 Sharps
Long rifle

References

Rifles
Bison hunting
Guns of the American West
Hunting rifles